Major General عبدالقیوم طوطاخیل (Abdul Qayum Tutakhail or Totakhil) was born in Sayed-Karam district of Paktia province Afghanistan. He was Assistant Minister of Defense for Health Affairs in Afghanistan. Prior to this General Tutakhail served as Surgeon General of the Afghan National Army and as a faculty lecturer of AFAMS teaching Combat Surgery, Tactics, Organization and Medical Ethics. Since the 1970s General Tutakhail has served in the Afghan Military in different capacities having a distinguished career. He is an ethnic Pashtun from the southern Paktia province.



Early life and career

Abdul Qayum Tutakhail son of Khan Mohammad Tutakhail was born in the Paktia province of Afghanistan in 1940. He attended Cadet College and after graduating he joined the Kabul Medical University receiving his MD degree. He completed further studies in the former Soviet Union at the Institute of Neurosurgery in Kiev receiving PhD degree. He specialized in neurosurgery / neurotraumatology with over 3,000 operations under his belt having introduced pioneering medical techniques.

Tutakhail was the author of many research papers such as combat trauma treatment methods, safeguard methods, supply and distribution of medical equipment, principles of injury treatment and trauma during combat.

Tutakhail's Postings 
   

By mid-December 2010 when the former Surgeon General Ahmad Zia Yaftali was fired amid accusations of corruption, theft of medicine worth 42 million US dollars destined to Afghan National Security Forces and deadly neglect of injured soldiers and policeman admitted in the Sardar Mohammad Dawood Khan hospital, General Abdul Qayum Tutakhail was reassigned to his previous post to help manage the situation. Since then the hospital has witnessed major improvements and there have not been any documented cases of neglect since February 2011.

References 

Living people
1940 births
Afghan neurosurgeons
Afghan military personnel
Afghan expatriates in the Soviet Union
Afghan military officers